Shadowlands is the seventh studio album by American progressive rock band Glass Hammer, released on January 14, 2004 by Arion Records/Sound Resources.

It is the last album with band founders Fred Schendel and Steve Babb acting as lead vocalists until Valkyrie, and the last album with Schendel acting as drummer.

Track listing 

Longer is a cover of Dan Fogelbergs song Longer.

Personnel 
Glass Hammer
 Fred Schendel – lead and backing vocals, steel, electric and acoustic guitars, Hammond Organ, piano, pipe organ, keyboards, synthesizers, Mellotron, drums, percussion
 Steve Babb – lead and backing vocals, 4-string and 8-string bass guitars, synthesizers, keyboards, pipe organ, Hammond organ, taurus pedels, Mellotron, percussion
 Susie Bogdanowicz – lead and backing vocals
 Walter Moore – lead and backing vocals

Additional musicians
 Sarah Snyder – Backing vocals
 Flo Paris – lead vocals on "So Close, So Far"
 Bethany Warren – backing vocals on "Run Lisette"

References 

Glass Hammer albums
2004 albums